The Bailiwick of Jersey (Jèrriais: Bailliage dé Jèrri) is a British Crown dependency off the French coast of Normandy.

As well as the island of Jersey itself, the Bailiwick includes the nearly uninhabited islands and islets of:

 Les Minquiers
 Maîtresse Île / Maîtr' Île
 Les Maisons
 Le Niêsant
 Les Faucheurs
 La Haute Grune
 Les Écréhous
 Maîtr'Île
 La Marmotchiéthe
 Lé Bliantch'Île
 Les D'mies
 La Grand' Naithe
 L'Êtchièrviéthe
 Lé Fou
 La Froutchie
 Les Dirouilles
 Les Pierres de Lecq
 L'Êtchièrviéthe
 La Rocque du Nord
  L'Êtaîse or L'Êtaîthe
 Lé Bel
 Lé Longis 
 La P'tite Mathe 
  La Grôsse  (Great Rock)
 La Grand' Mathe
 La Greune dé Lé, or La Bonnette 
 La Greune du Seur-Vouêt
 L'Orange
 La Vouêtaîse, La Vouêtaîthe, or La Vouêt'rêsse
 La Cappe 
 La Douoche
  Lé Byi 
 La Rocque Mollet
 L'Êtché au Nord-Vouêt
 La Galette
 La Briarde
 La Sprague
 La Niêthole Jean Jean or Lé Gouoillot
 Île Agois
 La Motte (Green Island), a tidal island
 L'Islet, site of Elizabeth Castle
 L'Île au Guerdain, site of Janvrin's Tomb
 Icho, site of Icho Tower
 L'Avarison, site of Seymour Tower
 La Rocque Ho
 La Grosse Tête
 Les Caînes 
 Le Grand Caramé 
 Le Petit Caramé
 Le Fara
 Les Rotchettes
 L'Île au Prêtre
 Le Cormoran
 Le Cheval Guillaume
 Lé Long Êtchet
 L'Étacquerel
 La Froutchie
 L'Île Pèrchie
 Hèrquantîn
 other unnamed rocks and reefs

By calling any of the above named entities "Islands", is a very generous representation. Most are no more than uninhabitable rocks jutting out of the sea. Les Écréhous are habitable; the rest would require a hardy individual to even attempt habitation.

References
 Details via the Bailiwick of Jersey

 
Jersey